Ticket or tickets may refer to:

Slips of paper
 Lottery ticket
 Parking ticket, a ticket confirming that the parking fee was paid (and the time of the parking start)
 Toll ticket, a slip of paper used to indicate where vehicles entered a toll road to charge based on an established rate when they exit
 Traffic ticket, a notice issued by a law enforcement official accusing violation of traffic laws

Admission
 Ticket (admission) (entrance ticket), a card or slip of paper used to gain admission to a location or event
 Electronic ticket, an electronic form of a transport ticket, entrance ticket etc.

Transport
 Airline ticket, a document created by an airline or a travel agent to confirm that an individual has purchased a seat on an airplane
 Train ticket, a document issued by a railway operator that enables the bearer to travel by train

Entertainment
 Ticket (1985 film), a film produced by Im Kwon Taek
 Ticket (2017 film), a comedy drama film
 Tickets (film), a 2005 film
 "Tickets" (song), a song by Maroon 5 from their album Overexposed

Other uses
 KTCK, AM 1310 & FM 104.1, a radio station in Dallas, Texas, USA, known as "The Ticket"
 Ticket (election), a single election choice which fills more than one political office or seat
 Ticket (IT security), a number generated by a network server as a means of authentication
 Ticket, a file in an issue tracking system documenting a reported problem and the steps taken to resolve it
 Ticket cases, a series of cases in contract law
 Tix, a former online currency in the massively multiplayer online game Roblox

See also

 
 
 Tick (disambiguation)
 Stub (disambiguation)